Leung Hung Tak (born 17 October 1963) is a Hong Kong former cyclist. He competed at the 1984 Summer Olympics and the 1988 Summer Olympics.

References

External links
 

1963 births
Living people
Hong Kong male cyclists
Olympic cyclists of Hong Kong
Cyclists at the 1984 Summer Olympics
Cyclists at the 1988 Summer Olympics
Commonwealth Games competitors for Hong Kong
Cyclists at the 1990 Commonwealth Games
Place of birth missing (living people)